The silky-flycatchers are a small family, Ptiliogonatidae, of passerine birds. The family contains only four species in three genera. They were formerly lumped with waxwings and hypocolius in the family Bombycillidae, and they are listed in that family by the Sibley-Monroe checklist. The family is named for their silky plumage and their aerial flycatching techniques, although they are unrelated to the Old World flycatchers (Muscicapidae) and the tyrant flycatchers (Tyrannidae).

They occur mainly in Central America from Panama to Mexico, with one species, the phainopepla, extending northwards into the southwestern US. Most do not engage in long-distance migration (instead wandering widely in search of fruit), but the phainopepla is migratory over the northern part of its range.

They are related to waxwings, and like that group have soft silky plumage, usually gray or pale yellow in color. All species, with the exception of the black-and-yellow phainoptila, have small crests. They range in size from 18 to 25 cm in length and are mostly slender birds (with the exception again of the black-and-yellow phainoptila). All the species in this family are sexually dimorphic in both plumage color and tail length. Juveniles of both sexes are colored like the female.

These birds eat fruit or insects. The phainopepla is particularly dependent on desert mistletoe, Phoradendron californicum.

They are found in various types of woodland (semi-desert with trees for the phainopepla), and they nest in trees.

Genera and Species

References

Ptiliogonatidae
Extant Miocene first appearances

Taxa named by Spencer Fullerton Baird